Oya'oya is an Oceanic dialect cluster spoken at the tip of the Papuan Peninsula in Papua New Guinea.

References

Nuclear Papuan Tip languages
Languages of Milne Bay Province